Dmytro Voloshyn may refer to:
 Dmytro Vitaliyovych Voloshyn, FC Kremin Kremenchuk defender
 Dmytro Oleksandrovych Voloshyn, IFK Mariehamn defender